Pozonia is a genus of orb-weaver spiders first described by E. Schenkel in 1953.

Species
 it contains five species:
Pozonia andujari Alayón, 2007 – Hispaniola
Pozonia bacillifera (Simon, 1897) – Trinidad to Paraguay
Pozonia balam Estrada-Alvarez, 2015 – Mexico
Pozonia dromedaria (O. Pickard-Cambridge, 1893) – Mexico to Panama
Pozonia nigroventris (Bryant, 1936) – Mexico to Panama, Cuba, Jamaica

References

Araneidae
Araneomorphae genera
Spiders of North America
Spiders of South America